Abryna buccinator is a species of beetle in the family Cerambycidae. It was described by Francis Polkinghorne Pascoe in 1864.

References

Pteropliini
Beetles described in 1864
Taxa named by Francis Polkinghorne Pascoe